Ralf Alastair John Little (born 8 February 1980) is an English actor, writer, presenter, narrator and former semi-professional footballer. He has worked mainly in television comedy, including playing Antony Royle in The Royle Family and Jonny Keogh in the first six series of Two Pints of Lager and a Packet of Crisps. He was the narrator of Channel 5's documentary series Our Yorkshire Farm from 2018 to 2020. Since 2020, he has starred as DI Neville Parker in Death in Paradise.

Early life
Ralf Alastair John Little was born in Bury and attended Bolton School (Boys' Division). His parents are accountants.
In 1998, Little abandoned his studies to become a doctor at the University of Manchester medical school, in order to concentrate on his acting career.

Career
Some of his early television roles included minor roles in various programmes such as Elidor, Children's Ward and  Sloggers. Little's big break came when he was offered the role of Antony Royle in the BBC sitcom The Royle Family. Little appeared in the show's original run from September 1998 to December 2000, before returning in three of the show's five Christmas specials, broadcast in 2006, 2009 and 2010.

In 2001, he was cast in a main role as Jonny Keogh for six series of Two Pints of Lager and a Packet of Crisps. During an interview for This Morning in September 2007, Little said that he would not be returning for the next series due to an overwhelming schedule, and his character was subsequently killed off.

In 1999, Little played the Star of Bethlehem in the ITV comedy drama The Flint Street Nativity and appeared in a minor role in Granada TVs Coronation Street in January 1999 as care home assistant Mark Stranks.

In December 2000, Little played Wishee Washee in the ITV Panto Aladdin, which was filmed in the New Wimbledon Theatre.

In 2001, he played the young George Harrison in Presence at the Royal Court Theatre, for which he was nominated for an Olivier Award for his performance. In 2004, he played the title character in Billy Liar at the Theatre Royal in Windsor. He appeared in Juliet McKoen's 2005 ghost story/murder mystery film Frozen, set in Fleetwood, Lancashire. Between November 2002 and January 2003, he hosted 17 one-hour-long episodes of The Ralf Little Show on BBC Choice.

Other film credits include 24 Hour Party People (playing Joy Division and New Order bass player Peter Hook) and Al's Lads. Little also starred as Stephen, alongside Anne-Marie Duff, in Roger Goldby's film, The Waiting Room, released throughout the UK in June 2008. In television, he also appeared in Paradise Heights.

In August 2007, he released his first online novel (co-written with Stephen Morris), The Golden Generation, a coming of age tale about a recently single man who is taken under the wings of two city traders who show him the trappings of big money in the big city but that it comes at a price. Money taken from the sale of the novel went to the charity Shelter. He was a cast member of KateModern, a web series developed by the creators of the US YouTube hit lonelygirl15, which started in July 2007 and posted its final video in June 2008.

In July 2008, he appeared in 50 Ways To Leave Your Lover, a new play at the Bush Theatre which was revised as 50 Ways To Leave Your Lover at Christmas. In September of the same year he starred in Massive, a BBC comedy about an indie record label. Also in 2008, Little became the narrator of Monkey Life, and the second series of Last Man Standing. In 2009, he played Clint in Married Single Other, alongside Miranda Raison He also worked on the film Powder. In the autumn of 2010, he starred in The Aliens, a British premiere of a new play by Annie Baker, again at the Bush Theatre. In 2011, he appeared as Richard Dickens in the comedy series The Café, shown on Sky 1, which he co-wrote with Michelle Terry.

In 2013, he appeared in Death in Paradise series two, episode six, and appeared at the Liverpool Playhouse as the father of a girl with cerebral palsy, in a production of A Day in the Death of Joe Egg.

In 2014, he appeared in the TV series Our Zoo. He also voiced Captain Skip in The Unbeatables, the English version of Argentine animated film Foosball.

He appeared as the character Steadfast in "Smile", the second episode of the 10th series of the BBC1 series Doctor Who in 2017.

In August 2018, Little starred as "Alan" in God of Carnage at the Theatre Royal, Bath.

In October 2019, he was confirmed as the new lead in Death in Paradise, returning to the series as a new character six years after his one-episode guest appearance.

In May 2020, Little, alongside his Royle Family co-star Ricky Tomlinson, presented a six-part travel series titled Ricky & Ralf's Very Northern Road Trip for Gold.

Football career

Little, a supporter of Manchester United, is a keen footballer and has played for a number of semi-professional clubs when other commitments allow. In March 2003 he played for Maidstone United against Wimbledon, having previously been training with Staines Town. He joined Isthmian League side Edgware Town in October 2004, making his debut in the FA Vase game against Waltham Abbey.

He played for Chertsey Town during the 2007–08 season and on 8 July 2008 signed for North West Counties League side Stone Dominoes. He has also played celebrity football matches for charity on a few occasions and played with members of Hollywood United while in the district for acting career purposes. He also plays for the Arsenal Ex-Pro and Celebrity XI. On 6 June 2010, he participated in a Soccer Aid game for England on the left wing.

On 9 August 2011, he played in the John Kennedy testimonial match for Manchester United against Celtic which resulted in a 5–2 win for Celtic.

In May 2012, he appeared for the Sealand national football team in a match against the Chagos Islands as captain. The match was held at the grounds of Godalming Town. In August 2012 and March 2013 he played in two games against Alderney, a 1–1 draw and 2–1 win respectively.

On 2 September 2017, he played in the Game 4 Grenfell match at Loftus Road, with the match proceeds going to the Grenfell disaster appeal.

Personal life
His great-grandfather, Albert Lockley, was a Welsh international footballer who played for Chirk.

Little is not religious and identifies as a humanist. He was appointed a patron of the humanist charity Humanists UK in 2020.

 Little is engaged to playwright and screenwriter Lindsey Ferrentino. They met in 2016 after Little was cast in Ferrentino’s play Ugly Lies the Bone.

Awards and nominations

References

External links
 
 

1980 births
Living people
20th-century English male actors
21st-century English male actors
Association football midfielders
English atheists
English expatriate sportspeople in the United States
Expatriate soccer players in the United States
English expatriate footballers
English footballers
English humanists
English male television actors
English male stage actors
English male film actors
English people of Welsh descent
Hollywood United players
Male actors from Oldham
Male actors from Lancashire
Stone Dominoes F.C. players
Edgware Town F.C. players
Maidstone United F.C. players
Staines Town F.C. players
Chertsey Town F.C. players
People educated at Bolton School
People from Bury, Greater Manchester